The 1968 United States Road Racing Championship season was the sixth and final season of the Sports Car Club of America's United States Road Racing Championship. It began March 31, 1968, and ended August 18, 1968, after nine races.  Mark Donohue won the season championship. The series would be revived thirty years later, but only for two years before becoming the Rolex Sports Car Series.

Schedule

Season results
Overall winners in bold.

External links
World Sports Racing Prototypes: USRRC 1968
Racing Sports Cars: USRRC archive

United States Road Racing Championship
United States Road Racing Championship